The Sheketak Group was created by duo Danny Rahum and Tzahi Patish in 1997. The Group's productions combine contemporary dance, lively music, video, and theater. The group put on their shows in Israel and in around 30 other countries worldwide.

The origin of the group's name is the blending of two words in Hebrew: Sheket (silence), and Tak (the creation of sound). The word "sheketak" is widely used by the group's artists in order to express rhythmic and musical phrases during a work process.

Sheketak won the "Young Creators" prize of the Ministry of Culture and Education of 2001.

Sheketak partook in various televisional and theatrical productions, such as "King Solomon and Shlomi the Shoemaker" in Habima Theater, and TV shows such as Kokhav Nolad, Nolad Lirkod, and Yair Lapid and Dudu Topaz's talk shows.

The managers of Sheketak created several soundtracks and choreography for many televisional productions and commercials.

Selected works

Elements
Beats in Movement
From Street Kids to Street Performers
The Nutcracker

References

External links
Sheketak's Website

Contemporary dance
Dance in Israel
Israeli culture